Juli Minoves i Triquell (born 15 August 1969, in Andorra la Vella) is an Andorran diplomat, author, and the 13th President of Liberal International.

Biography
Minoves was educated as an economist (University of Fribourg) and Political Scientist (Yale University).

Minoves served as Foreign Minister of Andorra from 12 April 2001 until 7 May 2007, at which point in time he was appointed Minister of Public Affairs (Government Spokesman), of Culture and Higher Education. From December 2007 until May 2009 he was Minister of Public Affairs, of Economic Development, Tourism, Culture and Universities.

Previously to his ministerial positions, Minoves had served Andorra as Ambassador Permanent representative to the United Nations, Ambassador to the United States of America, to Canada, the United Kingdom, Spain, Switzerland, Finland, and the World Trade Organization.

Minoves is vice president and member of the bureau (twice elected) of Liberal International. In 2014, he was elected President of Liberal International by the 59th Congress, which convened in Rotterdam, The Netherlands. He was succeeded as president by Hakima El Haite on 30 November 2018. 

Minoves is currently an Assistant Professor of Political Science at the University of La Verne in Southern California.

Published works
He is the author of multiple works of fiction, among which his novel Segles de Memòria was  awarded with the Fiter i Rossell Prize in 1989.

References

|-

1969 births
Living people
Foreign Ministers of Andorra
Ambassadors of Andorra to Canada
Ambassadors of Andorra to Finland
Ambassadors of Andorra to Spain
Ambassadors of Andorra to Switzerland
Ambassadors of Andorra to the United Kingdom
Ambassadors of Andorra to the United States
Andorran diplomats
Government ministers of Andorra
Presidents of the Liberal International
People from Andorra la Vella
Permanent Representatives of Andorra to the United Nations
University of Fribourg alumni
Yale University alumni
Andorran economists
Andorran expatriates in Switzerland